Wilf Bartrop (22 November 1887 – 7 November 1918) was a professional footballer, who played as a forward for several English sides prior to the First World War. He was killed in action, days before the end of the war.

Club career

He started his career at home side Worksop before transferring to Barnsley on 21 June 1909. He played in both FA Cup finals that Barnsley reached in 1910 and 1912. In the 1910 FA Cup, Bartrop scored a 'wonder goal' in a 1–0 quarter-final win over Queen's Park Rangers. In the final, Barnsley lost the replay 2–0 to Newcastle, after a 1–1 draw in the first tie. The 1912 cup final went again to a replay but Barnsley won, defeating West Bromwich Albion 1–0 in extra time, after a 0–0 draw in the first encounter. Many newspapers, including the Manchester Guardian, praised his play in the replay.

At the end of the 1913–14 season he transferred to Liverpool who he played a total of 3 games for before his career was interrupted by the First World War.

A biography of Wilfred Bartrop, entitled 'Swifter than the Arrow', was published in December 2008.

Honours
Barnsley
FA Cup: Winners   1912

His FA Cup winners medal was sold in 2008 for £14400 – more than twice its estimate price.

Military service
He joined the Royal Field Artillery as a Gunner in a Trench Mortar Battery. He was serving in Belgium when his unit came under heavy artillery fire at the river Escaut on 7 November 1918. Bartrop was severely wounded in the legs and chest by an airburst and died of wounds seconds later. His death took place 4 days before the end of the war.

The opening display in an exhibition on football and the Great War at the National Football Museum, Manchester, UK (2014 to 2015) focuses on Wilfred Bartrop. The display includes photographs, archive film footage and memorabilia including Bartrop's FA Cup winner's medal.

References

1887 births
1918 deaths
English footballers
Barnsley F.C. players
Liverpool F.C. players
British Army personnel of World War I
British military personnel killed in World War I
Worksop Town F.C. players
Association football outside forwards
Royal Field Artillery soldiers
FA Cup Final players